Sven Schulze (born 31 July 1979) is a German politician of the Christian Democratic Union (CDU) who has been serving as State Minister for Economic Affairs in the government of Minister-President of Saxony-Anhalt Reiner Haseloff since 2021. He was previously a Member of the European Parliament from 2014 to 2021.

Education and early career
Schulze studied industrial engineering at Technical University Clausthal, and then worked as a sales manager in a medium-sized engineering company in Harz.

Political career

Early beginnings
In 1997, Schulze joined the CDU and the Junge Union (youth of CDU). He was a member of the city council of Heteborn and in the county council of Quedlinburg.

Since 2006, Schulze has been a board member of the CDU from Saxony-Anhalt and the chairman of the Junge Union of Saxony-Anhalt. In 2011, he became chairman of the working committee for European affairs of the CDU of Saxony-Anhalt.

Member of the European Parliament, 2014–2021
In 2014, Schulze was elected to the European Parliament. In Parliament, he served as vice-chair of the Committee on Transport and Tourism from 2019. He was previously a member of the Committee on Industry, Research and Energy (2017-2019), the Committee on Employment and Social Affairs.

In addition to his committee assignments, Schulze was part of the parliament's delegations for relations with the Mashreq Countries, the Parliamentary Assembly - Union for the Mediterranean and with the countries of Southeast Asia and the Association of Southeast Asian Nations (since 2021). He also served as a member of the European Parliament Intergroup on Artificial Intelligence and Digital. and the European Parliament Intergroup on Biodiversity, Countryside, Hunting and Recreational Fisheries.

Career in state politics
Since 2021, Schulze has been serving as chairman of the CDU in Saxony-Anhalt.

As one of the state's representatives at the Bundesrat since 2021, Schulze serves on the Committee on Agriculture and Consumer Protection and the Committee on Economic Affairs. He is also a member of the German-Russian Friendship Group set up by the Bundesrat and the Russian Federation Council.

Schulze was nominated by his party as delegate to the Federal Convention for the purpose of electing the President of Germany in 2022.

Political positions
Ahead of the Christian Democrats’ leadership election in 2022, Schulze publicly endorsed Friedrich Merz to succeed Armin Laschet as the party’s chair.

References

External links
 http://www.schulze-europa.de
 http://www.europarl.europa.eu/meps/de/124809/SVEN_SCHULZE_home.html
 http://www.cdulsa.de/index.php?id=81
 http://www.schulze-europa.de/

1979 births
Living people
Christian Democratic Union of Germany MEPs
MEPs for Germany 2019–2024
MEPs for Germany 2014–2019
Politicians from Saxony-Anhalt